John Herrington is an astronaut.

John Herrington may also refer to:

John S. Herrington, American politician
John Herrington House and Herrington Bethel Church

See also
John Harrington (disambiguation)